Kid Paddle is a Belgian gag-a-day comic series created by Michel Ledent (Midam) in 1993. It was first published in the Franco-Belgian comics magazine Spirou until branching out into its own volume comic albums in 1996.

The series inspired an animated TV series produced by defunct animation studio Spectra Animation that aired on M6 and Canal J in France, RTBF Television in Belgium, and on Teletoon in Canada.

Overview

The series covers the passions and interests of 8 to 12 year old boys. The main character, Kid Paddle, is a boy with a passionate love for video games, comic books, fictional aliens called Blorkse, and sci-fi television. His two best friends are Big Bang and Horace. Big Bang is a kid scientist who is always creating new gadgets for Kid to try out and is very intelligent. Horace is more naïve compared to the other two and has a bizarre appetite. He is supportive of Kid and looks up at him. Kid often fights with his sister, Carol, who finds her brother to be a degenerate airhead.

Comics

The series has been released in 15 comic albums. The first 11 albums were published by Dupuis, with volume 12 onward being published by Mad Fabrik, Midam's own publishing company.

 Jeux de villain (Villain Games), 1996
 Carnage total (Total Carnage), 1996
 Apocalypse boy, 1997
 Full metal casquette (Full Metal Cap), (1998)
 Alien chantilly, 1999
 Rodéo Blork (Blork Rodeo), 2000
 Waterminator, 2001
 Paddle... My name is Kid Paddle, 2002
 Boing ! Boing ! Bunk !, 2005
 Dark, j'adore ! (I Love the Dark!), 2005
 Le retour de la momie qui pue qui tue (The Return of the Mummy Who Stinks, Who Kills), 2007
 Panik room, 2011
 Slime project, 2012
 Serial player, 2014
 Men in Blork, 2017
 Kid N'Roses, 2020
 Tatoo compris, 2021

Video games

Kid Paddle has had three video games that were released on various Nintendo platforms in Belgium and France. These include Kid Paddle for the Game Boy Advance, released in 2005, Kid Paddle: Blorks Invasion for the Nintendo DS, released in 2007, and Kid Paddle: Lost in the Game, released for both the Wii and DS in 2008.

Kid Paddle: Puzzle Monsters is an iPad and iPhone video game based on the comic series and published by Anuman Interactive in 2009.

References

External links
 Kid Paddle Official Website

Belgian comic strips
1993 comics debuts
Comics characters introduced in 1993
Humor comics
Gag-a-day comics
Child characters in comics
Fictional Belgian people
Comics adapted into animated series
Comics adapted into television series
Belgian comics characters
Dupuis titles